In topology, a field within mathematics, desuspension is an operation inverse to suspension.

Definition
In general, given an n-dimensional space , the suspension  has dimension n + 1. Thus, the operation of suspension creates a way of moving up in dimension. In the 1950s, to define a way of moving down, mathematicians introduced an inverse operation , called desuspension. Therefore, given an n-dimensional space , the desuspension  has dimension n – 1.

In general, .

Reasons
The reasons to introduce desuspension:
Desuspension makes the category of spaces a triangulated category.
If arbitrary coproducts were allowed, desuspension would result in all cohomology functors being representable.

See also
Cone (topology)
Equidimensionality
Join (topology)

References

External links
Desuspension at an Odd Prime
When can you desuspend a homotopy cogroup?

Topology
Homotopy theory